Tracy is an unincorporated community located within Monroe Township in Middlesex County, New Jersey, United States. The settlement is located at the site of a former station on the Freehold and Jamesburg Agricultural Railroad in the southeastern edge of the township. Most of the area is forestland with some homes and light commercial businesses located along Federal Road and Tracy Station Road.

References

Monroe Township, Middlesex County, New Jersey
Unincorporated communities in Middlesex County, New Jersey
Unincorporated communities in New Jersey